The Other Hand is a major label debut album by the international indie rock band très.b. It was released on September 21, 2010 in Poland.

Background
The album was recorded in Warsaw at Studio 333 and was mixed in New York City by Victor Van Vugt, who has worked with acts like: PJ Harvey, Nick Cave and Depeche Mode.

Reception
The album has been very well received. It has been called a "Sensation of the fall" (Wprost), "MUST HAVE album" (Onet) and "World class album" (Machina).

Awards 

|-
| Fryderyk 2011 || Très.B || Best Debut Album of the Year (Fonograficzny Debiut Roku) ||

Videos
A video for "Orange, Apple" was released in August, 2010, made by très.b, filmed in and around Amsterdam. 
Another music video for "Venus Untied" was released in December 2010.

Track listing

Personnel
très.b (most of instruments recording, production, arrangement):
Misia Furtak
Olivier Heim
Thomas Pettit

Other personnel
Strings: Michał Jelonek
Brass: Tomasz Grzegorski
Double Bass Michał Jaros
Rhodes and Hammond Michał "Fox" Król
Syth and modular synth Maciek Polak
extra rhodes Michał Wróblewski
Hurdy gurdy Maciek "Korba" Cierliński

Technical personnel
Bartłomiej Kuźniak (also guitar and alto saxophone on tracks 13 and 14)
Victor van Vugt
Olivier Heim
Art direction - très.b and Monika Baran 
Artwork design - Misia Furtak and Monika Baran
Artwork edit - IAMKAT
Photography - Misia Furtak and Monika Baran

References

External links
 Très.b official website

2010 albums
Concept albums